Space Age 4 Eva is the fifth studio album by American hip hop duo 8Ball & MJG. The album released on November 21, 2000, by JCOR Entertainment and Interscope Records. The music video for the album's first single "Pimp Hard" marked the directorial debut of photographer Anthony Mandler.

Track listing

Charts

References

2000 albums
8Ball & MJG albums
Albums produced by Swizz Beatz
Albums produced by DJ Quik